Hannatu Jibrin Salihu is the commissioner of education, Niger State,  Nigeria.

Career 
In 2020 she was invited to Singapore where she delivered a speech on creativity and innovation in education in Nigeria.

As a commissioner of education, Salihu set plan after a sum of N86 million is approved by the state government to quarantine, provide feeding and repatriation of Almajirai pupils, after other state governments have return them to their various states of origin. She also make an announcement towards a fixed date to resume schools after a long lockdown of COVID-19 pandemic in the entire nation.

References

External links 
 Hannatu Jibrin Salihu  on Twitter

Living people
People from Niger State
Nigerian women in politics
Year of birth missing (living people)